Thomas Moser (born 27 May 1945) is an American-Austrian operatic tenor.

Life 
Born in Richmond, Virginia, Moser first studied singing at Curtis Institute of Music in Philadelphia and with Martial Singher at the Music Academy of the West, attended master classes with Lotte Lehmann and Gérard Souzay - before moving to Europe in 1975. There he made his debut in Graz, first as lyric tenor and Mozart interpreter. Only two years later, Moser sang for the first time at the Vienna State Opera, as Iopas in Berlioz' opera Les Troyens).

In the 1990s, Moser increasingly turned to heldentenor roles and first appeared as Lohengrin, then also as Parsifal and finally also as Tristan. In this role he celebrated an outstanding success at the side of Deborah Voigt in Vienna in spring 2003 in the new production directed by Christian Thielemann and Günter Krämer.

Moser has been an Austrian citizen since 1992.

References

External links 
 
 Discography on Discogs
 Thomas Moser on Allmusic
 Interview with Bruce Duffie (englisch, 1998)
 J.S. Bach - Johannes-Passion- Erwäge wie sein blutgefärbter (youTube)

1945 births
Living people
Musicians from Richmond, Virginia
Austrian operatic tenors
20th-century American male opera singers
20th-century Austrian male opera singers
American operatic tenors
Curtis Institute of Music alumni
Music Academy of the West alumni
21st-century Austrian male opera singers
Singers from Virginia
Classical musicians from Virginia
American emigrants to Austria